Maritato is an Italian surname. Notable people with the surname include:

James Maritato (born 1972), American professional wrestler
Piergiuseppe Maritato (born 1989), Italian footballer

Italian-language surnames